Frank Louis Baker (July 23, 1909 – September 14, 1985) was an American football end for the Green Bay Packers of the National Football League (NFL). He played college football for Northwestern where he was an All-American in 1930. He won an NFL championship in 1931.

Biography
Baker was born on July 23, 1909, in Madison, Wisconsin.

Career
Baker played with the Green Bay Packers during the 1931 NFL season. He played at the collegiate level at Northwestern University.

See also
List of Green Bay Packers players

References

1909 births
1985 deaths
American football ends
Green Bay Packers players
Northwestern Wildcats football players
All-American college football players
Sportspeople from Madison, Wisconsin
Players of American football from Wisconsin